Cédric Kahn (born 17 June 1966) is a French screenwriter, film director and actor. His films include L'Ennui (1998), based on the Alberto Moravia novel Boredom, and Red Lights (2004), based on the Georges Simenon novel. His film Roberto Succo was entered into the 2001 Cannes Film Festival.

Filmography

As director / screenwriter

As actor

As editor
1993: L'Exposé

References

External links

French film directors
1966 births
Living people
French male screenwriters
French screenwriters
People from Drôme
21st-century French male actors
French male film actors